Halanuru   is a village in Tumkur taluk, Karnataka, 13 km from Tumkur and  from Mallasandra.

Economy
Agriculture is the primary industry in Halnoor; crops include coconut, areca, paddy, jowar, vegetables, flowers, tamarind, mango and sapota. There are also some small scale Industries.

Irrigation needs are supplied by two area lakes, one of which is fed with Hemavathi channel water.

Tourism

Malleshwara Swamy Temple which is in Halnoor is a major religious place for the Hindus around Halnoor, it has Jathra Mahothsava every year after one week of Ugadi festival.
Halanuru has temples like Kashi Eshwara, Basavanna temple, Maruthi, and Gramadevathe Maramma,

Politics
Halnoor votes to elect MLA for Tumkur rural constituency, MP for Tumkur constituency and also elects around 7 members for the Mallasandra grama panchayati.

Education
Halnoor has educational institutes which help students for education up to 12th std./2nd P.U.C.and Sanskrit education.

How to get there
Halnoor is connected to Tumkur by a bus service. By train, a passenger can take a slow train to Shimoga, Aarsikere, or Hubli, get down at Mallasandra station. From there one can rent a rikshaw.

Villages in Tumkur district